The 1994–95 Boise State Broncos men's basketball team represented Boise State University during the 1994–95 NCAA Division I men's basketball season. The Broncos were led by twelfth-year head coach Bobby Dye and played their home games on campus at the BSU Pavilion in Boise, Idaho.

In the conference tournament at Ogden, Utah, the fifth-seeded Broncos were stopped by fourth seed Idaho State by two points in a  Dye retired five months later in August, and longtime assistant Rod Jensen

Postseason results

|-
!colspan=6 style=| Big Sky tournament

References

External links
Sports Reference – Boise State Broncos – 1994–95 basketball season

Boise State Broncos men's basketball seasons
Boise State
Boise State